
Gmina Dziadkowice is a rural gmina (administrative district) in Siemiatycze County, Podlaskie Voivodeship, in north-eastern Poland.

Villages
Gmina Dziadkowice contains the villages and settlements of Brzeziny-Janowięta, Dołubowo, Dziadkowice, Hornowo, Hornowszczyzna, Jasienówka, Kąty, Korzeniówka, Lipiny, Malewice, Malinowo, Osmola, Smolugi, Smolugi-Kolonia, Wojeniec, Zaminowo, Zaporośl, Zaręby, Żuniewo and Żurobice.

Neighbouring gminas
Gmina Dziadkowice is bordered by the gminas of Boćki, Brańsk, Grodzisk, Milejczyce and Siemiatycze.

References
Polish official population figures 2006

Dziadkowice
Siemiatycze County